Abus Valley is an ice-free valley  southeast of Turnstile Ridge at the north end of Britannia Range. Named in association with Britannia by a University of Waikato (New Zealand) geological party, 1978–79, led by Michael Selby. Abus was the name of the River Humber during the Roman period.

Valleys of Oates Land